Wouter Raskin (born 4 January 1972, in Bilzen) is a Belgian-Flemish politician and a member of the New Flemish Alliance party.

Biography
Raskin was born in Bilzen and studied economics at Hasselt University. He then worked as a coordinator for a social economic company in Sint-Truiden and became an advisor to the N-VA in 2010. In the 2014 Belgian federal election, he was elected to the Belgian Chamber of Representatives for the Limburg constituency. In 2019, he was re-elected to the Chamber on second place on the Limburg list.

References 

Living people
1972 births
21st-century Belgian politicians
People from Bilzen
New Flemish Alliance politicians
Members of the Chamber of Representatives (Belgium)